Tirumalisai Alvar (Born: Bhargavar 4203 BCE - 297 CE) is a Tamil saint revered in the Sri Vaishnavism school of south India, in Tondai Nadu (now part of Kanchipuram and Tiruvallur districts). He was born in 4203 BCE. The legend of this saint devotees of Sri Vaishnavism believe that he was the incarnation of Vishnu's disc, Sudarshana. He is believed to have been born at the Jagannatha Perumal temple, Tirumalisai, by "divine grace".

Historically, Tirumalisai Alvar is regarded to have been the son of a sage.

Alvars

The word Alvar means the one who dives deep into the ocean of the countless attributes of god. Alvars are considered to have been the twelve supreme devotees of Vishnu, who were instrumental in popularising Vaishnavism in South India. The religious works of these saints in Tamil, songs of love and devotion, are compiled as Naalayira Divya Prabandham containing 4000 verses and the 108 temples revered in their songs are classified as Divya desam. The saints had different origins and belonged to different castes. As per tradition, the first three Alvars, Poigai, Bhutha and Pey were born miraculously. Tirumalisai was the son of a sage, Thondaradi, Mathurakavi, Periyalvar and Andal were from the Brahmin community, Kulasekhara from Kshatriya community, Nammalvar was from a cultivator family, Tirupana from the panar community and Tirumangai from kalvar community. Divya Suri Saritra by Garuda-Vahana Pandita (11th century CE), Guruparamparaprabavam by Pinbaragiya Perumal Jiyar, Periya tiru mudi adaivu by Anbillai Kandadiappan, Yatindra Pranava Prabavam by Pillai Lokacharya, commentaries on Divya Prabandam, Guru Parampara (lineage of Gurus) texts, temple records and inscriptions give a detailed account of the Alvars and their works. According to these texts, the saints were considered incarnations of some form of Vishnu. Poigai is considered an incarnation of Panchajanya (Krishna's conch), Bhoothath of Kaumodakee (Vishnu's Mace/Club), Pey of Nandaka (Vishnu's sword), Thirumalisai of	Sudarshanam (Vishnu's discus), Namm of Vishvaksena (Vishnu's commander), Madhurakavi of	Vainatheya (Vishnu's eagle, Garuda), Kulasekhara of	Kaustubha (Vishnu's necklace), Periy of Garuda (Vishnu's eagle), Andal of Bhoodevi (Vishnu's wife, Lakshmi, in her form as Bhudevi), Thondaradippodi of Vanamaalai (Vishnu's garland), Thiruppaan of Srivatsa (An auspicious mark on Vishnu's chest) and Thirumangai of Saranga (Rama's bow). The songs of Prabandam are regularly sung in all the Vishnu temples of South India daily and also during festivals.

Early life
The name of the Alvar comes from his birthplace, Tirumalisai, a suburb in modern-day Chennai. 

According to Puranas, it was the onset of Kali Yuga (the dark age). Vishnu was worried about the next incarnation his weapon to take because, Kali Yuga has started and he didn't know how his relations will spend their life on Earth since they had to spend a normal Human life. It was the onset of Kali Yuga, and Vishnu was worried about this and when enquired he told the terrible attitudes of people during the Kali Yuga and how can his dear ones can spend their life on Earth in such a dark age, when Sudarshana intervened and volunteered to be born on Earth when Vishnu objected again exclaiming the attributes of Kali Yuga. Sudarshana still obliged leaving Vishnu tearful. He had a weird birth story. This was when Bhargava maharishi was in a long tapa (penance) to please Vishnu, as usual to spoil his penance Indra sent an apsara for which he succeeded. After enjoying worldly pleasures the apsara left to heaven leaving back the baby born to them. Due to his attachment to continue the penance, he cannot take care of the child and left it on the ground. Many days passed and the baby was crying a lot and nobody turned around to look after him. He was covered with blood and worms and mosquitoes are continuously biting him. Worried, Vishnu and Lakshmi descended to Earth and touched the baby and disappeared. The baby was transformed into a handsome young boy. The boy being Sudharshana Chakra himself was devoid of any illness though was hungry for many many days. All were wondering how could this be possible when a childless couple adopted him. Even then he did not accept single grain of rice from the couple. One day, an old man and woman paid visit to this boy. The boy was happy to see them when they asked to go for a short walk along the temple premises. The boy obliged and the old man and woman seemed worried and when enquired, they answered that the sadness cannot be prevented in that age. Still he enquired to which the old couple answered they are yearning for parental affection, to which this boy seemed too casual and wrote two pasurams in praise of Vishnu and miraculously the old couple was transformed into young and good looking couple. They thanked the boy a lot and this boy was too happy because in the Kali Yuga period people are also being thankful to which he wrote another pasuram in praise of Lord Vishnu. The boy asked the couple to read the pasuram, and the couple was blessed with a baby boy whom they named as Kanikannan. Kanikannan grew up to be a disciple of the boy. One time, after the demise of the couple, knowing about the glory of the boy and his disciple Kanikannan, the jealous chola king who was a strong shaivaite ordered him to sacrifice Vaishnavism and practice Shaivism to which they declined, and accordingly they were subjected to death. Somehow both escaped the place to Srirangam. Another news reached their ears that they (the boy and Kanikannan) must be killed or must be exiled, if found anywhere. Worried, they visited all Vishnu temples in Tamilnadu, and when they paid the tributes to Ranganatha Perumal in Srirangam, one amazing and miracle happened. The statue of Ranganatha woke up and stopped these two, and they declined stating it is a duty for the citizens to obey the order of their ruler. Next, they both visited Kumbakonam Sarangapani temple, and the statue again rose, and this time both obliged and merged with the lord. To be a proof of future generations that the idol actually rose up, Vishnu's head in Sarangapani temple is raised a bit. The boy was called Thirumalisai Alvar thereafter.

An alternative is that he was born to Bhargava maharishi and his wife Kanakangi after an unusual 12 months stay in the womb. The foetus came out as just a lifeless lump of flesh with no arms and legs. The couple were terribly depressed and with unwillingness left it under a bamboo bush and proceeded with their spiritual journey. Vishnu appeared with Lakshmi and blessed the "flesh" with their kataksham and it turned into an lively human being.

He was later picked up with both the arms affectionately by a tribal named Thiruvalan. A really blessed couple Thiruvalan and pankajavalli, was overwhelmed by the grace of god for this gift of a baby. The boy grew on to become Tirumalisai Alvar. He also has an eye on his right leg. He lived up to 10 years of age in a hamlet near Tirumalisai village named as Pirayampathu. This Alvar was an incarnation of Sudarsana Chakra ( the divine discus of Lord Vishnu).

Tirumalisai Alvar decided to learn about all other religions. He also got initiated into Vaishnavism by Pey Alvar. After visiting several temples, he reached Tiruvekka, the birthplace of Poigai Alvar.

Displeasing the Pallava king
Legend also says that when Kanikannan, his disciple displeased the pallava king for not agreeing to restore the king's youth. Earlier on he granted youth to an old unmarried maid of the temple. The king married that woman but he himself was an old man and thus wanted to enjoy life as a youth with his new wife. Tirumalisai refused him and the king decided to banish him. Tirumalisai Alvar asked the God from the temple, Yathotkari, to leave with him.

Vishnu is said to have rolled up the snake Sesha like a mattress and left with him.

Mangalasasanam
There are 216 of his paasurams in the 4000 Divya Prabhandham. His first Prabandham named Tiruchanda Viruttam contains 120 hymns and starts from 752 paasuram and ends at 871 paasuram. The second Prabandham of Tirumalisai Alvar is titled Naanmugan Thiruvandhadhi and it contains 96 verses. The work of Naanmugan Thiruvandhadhi starts from 2382 paasuram and ends at 2477 paasuram.

He has sung in praise of 20 temples.

Notes

References

External links

Vaishnava saints
Alvars
Tamil Hindu saints